Medusa is either of two paintings described in Giorgio Vasari's Life of Leonardo da Vinci as being among Leonardo's earliest works. Neither painting survived.

First version 

In his Vita di Leonardo (1568), Vasari reports that, as a very young man, Leonardo represented the head of Medusa on a wooden shield after a request by his father, Ser Piero da Vinci:
 

Although art historians have doubted the veracity of this anecdote, Leonardo's shield (long since lost) has been said to inspire several early 17th-century painters who may have seen it in the collection of Ferdinand I de Medici. Rubens and Caravaggio are known to have painted their own versions of the subject, but their indebtedness to Leonardo's painting (assuming they had seen it) is uncertain and potentially unknowable.

Uffizi painting 

In 1782, Leonardo's biographer Luigi Lanzi, while making a search for his paintings in the Uffizi, discovered a depiction of Medusa's head which he erroneously attributed to Leonardo, based on Vasari's description of Leonardo's second version of the subject:

Lanzi summed up his opinion on the newly discovered painting in his description of the Florentine gallery:

In the period of Romanticism, the reputed Leonardo garnered much praise. Its full-page engravings, first produced in Florence in 1828, spread across Europe, making the painting one of the most popular in Leonardo's corpus of works. In 1851, Jean Baptiste Gustave Planche proclaimed: "I do not hesitate to say that in the Medusa of the Uffizi there is the germ of what we admire in the Gioconda of the Louvre".

As late as 1868, Walter Pater (in The Renaissance) singled out Medusa as one of the most arresting works by Leonardo. In the 20th century, Bernard Berenson and other leading critics argued against Leonardo's authorship of the Uffizi painting. It is now believed to be a work of an anonymous Flemish painter, active ca. 1600.

References

Turner, Almond Richard. Inventing Leonardo. University of California Press, 1994. 
Vasari, Giorgio https://archive.today/20121212095815/http://www-class.unl.edu/ahis398b/classmats/vasari.html Life of Leonardo], 1568.

Paintings by Leonardo da Vinci
Lost paintings
Cultural depictions of Medusa
Paintings depicting Greek myths
Snakes in art